Sulciolus is a genus of moths in the family Lecithoceridae.

Species
 Sulciolus abrasa (Diakonoff, 1954)
 Sulciolus capra (Diakonoff, 1954)
 Sulciolus circulivalvae Park, 2012
 Sulciolus induta (Diakonoff, 1954)
 Sulciolus kaindiana Park, 2012
 Sulciolus pachystoma (Diakonoff, 1954)
 Sulciolus perspicua (Diakonoff, 1954)

References

 
Lecithocerinae
Moth genera
Taxa described in 2012